The Walther Schücking Institute of International Law at the University of Kiel was founded in 1914 as the Institut für Internationales Recht. It is the oldest university institute for public international law in Germany. The institute ranks among the top three international law institutes within Germany and has a great reputation throughout Europe.

The Institute was renamed in 1995 in honor of Walther Schücking, professor of international law at the University of Kiel from 1926-1933 and the first German judge at the Permanent Court of International Justice in The Hague from 1930-1935.

References

External links
Christian-Albrechts-Universität zu Kiel (German)

International law